The Blue Marble is an image of Earth taken on December 7, 1972, from a distance of about 29,000 kilometers (18,000 miles) from the planet's surface.

Blue Marble may also refer to:

 Big Blue Marble, a half-hour children's television series that ran from 1974 to 1983
 The Blue Marble, an album by the American sunshine pop band Sagittarius
 Blue Marble Energy, a US-based company which utilizes hybridized bacteria to produce specialty biochemicals and renewable biogas
 Blue Marble Game, a Korean board game similar to Monopoly
 Blue Marble Geographics, a developer and provider of geographic information system software products
 Elaeocarpus angustifolius (also Blue Marble Tree), a large and fast growing rainforest tree

See also
 Marble (disambiguation)